Nee Soon Central Single Member Constituency was a single member constituency (SMC) in the northern area of Singapore. The seat consists of Yishun Town Centre (Neighbourhood 9), Neighbourhood 6 and part of Neighbourhood 7. 

The constituency was formed in 1988 and has been held by the ruling party from 1988 to 1991 when the People's Action Party lost the seat to Singapore Democratic Party's Cheo Chai Chen but Cheo lost to Ong in 1997 Singapore general election. In 2011, the constituency was merged into Nee Soon Group Representation Constituency.

Member of Parliament

Elections

Elections in the 2000s

Elections in 1990s

Elections in 1980s

See also
Nee Soon SMC
Nee Soon GRC
Nee Soon East SMC
Nee Soon South SMC

References
1988 GE's result
1991 GE's result
1997 GE's result
2001 GE's result
2006 GE's result

Singaporean electoral divisions
Yishun